Beline Toledo Ovando (born 13 February 2002) is a Mexican professional footballer who plays as a midfielder for Ascenso MX club Leones Negros UdeG.

Club career
Toledo was first called up to the UdeG first team in January 2019, and was an unused substitute during three Copa MX matches. He was officially promoted to the first team the following season, playing in several pre-season friendlies in July 2019. He made his professional debut later that month, coming on for Alan Murillo during the second half of a Copa MX match against C.F. Monterrey on 31 July. Two weeks later, during a Copa MX defeat to Cafetaleros de Chiapas, he received a yellow card in his second appearance.

Career statistics

Club

Notes

References

External links
 
 

Living people
2002 births
Association football midfielders
Leones Negros UdeG footballers
Liga de Expansión MX players
Liga Premier de México players
Tercera División de México players
Footballers from Chiapas
Mexican footballers
People from Tuxtla Gutiérrez